John Isner was the defending champion and successfully defended his title, defeating Ryan Harrison in a rematch of the 2017 final, 5–7, 6–3, 6–4.

Seeds
The top four seeds receive a bye into the second round.

Draw

Finals

Top half

Bottom half

Qualifying

Seeds

Qualifiers

Lucky loser
  Hubert Hurkacz

Qualifying draw

First qualifier

Second qualifier

Third qualifier

Fourth qualifier

References
Main draw
Qualifying draw

Atlanta Open - Singles
2018 ATP World Tour
2018 Singles
Atlanta